Bakersfield Country Club is an 18-hole private golf course located in Bakersfield, California. The course is 6,819 yards on hilly terrain, designed by William P. Bell. Being located in the foothills of northeast Bakersfield makes this one of the few courses within Kern County that is naturally hilly. The club has reciprocating privileges to all private golf clubs in the Greater Bakersfield area. It is a championship course, which has hosted the Bakersfield Open Invitational between 1961 and 1962, which was a tournament on the PGA Tour. 

The club also includes: exercise rooms, club room (for cards), lounge, and four lighted tennis courts. Three dining facilities are provided for both lunch and dinner. Large banquet room provides space for large events, up to 250 people.

Scorecard

Demographics

In 2020, the United States Census Bureau made the Bakersfield Country Club and the residential areas outside its southern perimeter as a separate census-designated place (CDP) for statistical purposes. The residential areas are in an unincorporated area outside the borders of the City of Bakersfield. Per the 2020 census, the population was 1,715.

2020 census

Note: the US Census treats Hispanic/Latino as an ethnic category. This table excludes Latinos from the racial categories and assigns them to a separate category. Hispanics/Latinos can be of any race.

References

External links
 Bakersfield Country Club

Golf clubs and courses in Bakersfield, California
Sports venues completed in 1950
1950 establishments in California
Golf clubs and courses designed by William P. Bell